The 2016–17 Senior Women's Challenger Trophy was the seventh edition of the women's List-A tournament in India. It was played from 22 October to 25 October 2016. It was played in a round-robin format, with a final between the top two teams. India Red won the tournament, beating India Blue in the final by 7 wickets.

Squads

Standings

Source: CricketArchive

Group stage

Final

Overview 

The Mithali Raj-led India Blue had won both their league matches to book a place in the finals while India Red had only beaten India Green in the run up to the finals. With a seven-wicket win against India Blue in the final, India Red lifted the Women's Challenger Trophy 2016–17. Smriti Mandhana led the 130-run chase in the one-day game with an unbeaten 62-run knock after the Jhulan Goswami-led attack had restricted the opposition to a sub-par score.

References 

2016–17 Indian women's cricket
2016–17
Domestic cricket competitions in 2016–17